Giovanni Francesco Brignole Sale may refer to:
Giovanni Francesco I Brignole Sale (1582–1637), Doge of Genoa
Giovanni Francesco II Brignole Sale (1695–1760), Doge of Genoa